Oedipina poelzi, commonly known as the quarry worm salamander, is a species of salamander in the family Plethodontidae.
It is endemic to Costa Rica and found in the Cordillera de Tilarán, Cordillera Central, and Cordillera de Talamanca.

Its natural habitats are tropical moist montane forests, rivers, and heavily degraded former forest.
It is threatened by habitat loss.

References

Oedipina
Amphibians of Costa Rica
Endemic fauna of Costa Rica
Taxonomy articles created by Polbot
Amphibians described in 1963